Enrique de Ridder (born 21 February 1958) is an Argentine alpine skier. He competed in two events at the 1984 Winter Olympics.

References

1958 births
Living people
Argentine male alpine skiers
Olympic alpine skiers of Argentina
Alpine skiers at the 1984 Winter Olympics
Skiers from Buenos Aires